Cross-docking is a practice in logistics of unloading materials from a manufacturer or mode of transportation directly to the customer or another mode of transportation, with little or no storage in between. This may be done to change the type of conveyance, to sort material intended for different destinations, or to combine material from different origins into transport vehicles (or containers) with the same or similar destinations.

Cross docking takes place in a distribution docking terminal; usually consisting of trucks and dock doors on two (inbound and outbound) sides with minimal storage space.

In the LTL trucking industry, cross-docking is done by moving cargo from one transport vehicle directly onto another, with minimal or no warehousing. In retail practice, cross-docking operations may utilize staging areas where inbound materials are sorted, consolidated, and stored until the outbound shipment is complete and ready to ship.

History 
Cross-dock operations were pioneered in the US trucking industry in the 1930s, and have been in continuous use in less-than-truckload operations ever since. The US military began using cross-docking operations in the 1950s. Wal-Mart began using cross-docking in the retail sector in the late 1980s.

As of 2014 almost half of all US warehouses are cross-docking.

Advantages of retail cross-docking
 Streamlines the supply chain, from point of origin to point of sale 
 Reduces labor costs through less inventory handling 
 Reduces inventory holding costs by reducing storage times and potentially eliminating the need to retain safety stock 
 Products reach the distributor, and consequently the customer, faster 
 Reduces or eliminates warehousing costs 
 May increase available retail sales space
 Less risk of inventory handling
 No need for large warehouse areas
 Easier to screen product quality

Risks of cross-docking 
 Fewer suppliers
Supply chain vulnerability from disruptions
Reduced storage availability
 An adequate transport fleet is needed to operate
 A computerized logistics system is needed
 Additional freight handling can lead to product damage
 Labor costs are also incurred in the moving and shipping of stock
 Accidentally splitting up shipments larger than a single pallet leading to multiple deliveries or lost items

Types of Cross-docking
 Full Pallet Load Operation
 Case-load Order Makeup
 Hybrid Cross-docking
 Opportunistic Cross-docking
 Truck/Rail Consolidation
 Short-term Storage

Typical applications
"Hub and spoke" arrangements, where materials are brought in to one central location and then sorted for delivery to a variety of destinations
Consolidation arrangements, where a variety of smaller shipments are combined into one larger shipment for economy of transport
Deconsolidation arrangements, where large shipments (e.g., railcar lots) are broken down into smaller lots for ease of delivery

Retail cross-dock example: using cross-docking, Wal-Mart was able to effectively leverage its logistical volume into a core strategic competency.
 Wal-Mart operates an extensive satellite network of distribution centers serviced by company-owned trucks
 Wal-Mart's satellite network sends point-of-sale (POS) data directly to 4,000 vendors.
 Each register is directly connected to a satellite system sending sales information to Wal-Mart’s headquarters and distribution centers.

Factors influencing the use of retail cross-docks
 Cross-docking depends on continuous communication between suppliers, distribution centers, and all points of sale
 Customer and supplier geography, particularly when a single corporate customer has many multiple branches or using points
 Freight costs for the commodities being transported
 Cost of inventory in transit
 Complexity of loads
 Handling methods
 Logistics software integration between supplier(s), vendor, and shipper
 Tracking of inventory in transit

Products Suitable For Cross-docking 

 Perishable goods- These are products that are time sensitive like agricultural products and require instant shipping. Other products that use Last In First Out inventory management method may also apply cross docking.
 Staple products- Staple products like staple food, clothes always have a high demand and go through a less storage time. Businesses with these types of products may include them in their cross docking model to reduce storage costs.
 Promotional items- Cross-docking comes in handy for eCommerce platforms that have clearance sale programs.

Cross-dock facility design
Cross-dock facilities are generally designed in an "I" configuration, which is an elongated rectangle. The goal in using this shape is to maximize the number of inbound and outbound doors that can be added to the facility while keeping the floor area inside the facility to a minimum. Bartholdi and Gue (2004) demonstrated that this shape is ideal for facilities with 150 doors or less. For facilities with 150–200 doors, a "T" shape is more cost effective. Finally, for facilities with 200 or more doors, the cost-minimizing shape is an "X".

References

Making the Move to Crossdocking, Maida Napolitano and the staff of Gross & Associates, 2000 copyright, www.werc.org

Business terms
Freight transport